Zahora may refer to:
 Zahora (plant), a genus of flowering plants
 , a village in Zolochiv Raion, Lviv Oblast, Ukraine
 , a village in Rivne Raion, Rivne Oblast, Ukraine
 Dario Zahora, Croatian football player

See also 
 Zohara
 Zagora (disambiguation)